The 2016 Chilean telethon (Spanish: Teletón 2016) is the 28th version of the solidarity campaign to be held in Chile, which wants to raise funds for the rehabilitation of children with motor disabilities. It will be held from the Teatro Teletón from 22:00 on Friday, December 2 until 21:00 on Saturday, December 3 and from Julio Martínez National Stadium from 22:00 in its final stretch. The child symbol or "ambassador" of this edition is Vicente Jopia. Its slogan is El abrazo de Chile (The hug of Chile).

The event ended fulfilling the goal with a final count of CLP32,040,179,848.

Broadcasting 

The transmission of the event will be held jointly by all television channels grouped in the National Association of Television of Chile (ANATEL):

 Telecanal
 La Red
 UCV Television
 TVN/TV Chile (international)
 Mega
 Chilevisión
 Canal 13 (Chile)/13i (international)

Radios 

 ADN Radio Chile
 Radioactiva
 Radio Agricultura
 Radio Bio-Bio
 Radio Carolina
 Radio Cooperativa
 Radio Disney
 Radio La Clave
 Play FM
 Radio Pudahuel
 Tele13 Radio
 Radio Digital FM
 Radio Positiva FM
 Radio Portales

Hosts 

 Mario Kreutzberger Don Francisco
 Rafael Araneda
 Cecilia Bolocco
 Diana Bolocco
 Martín Cárcamo
 Carolina de Moras
 Karen Doggenweiler
 Julián Elfenbein
 Ignacio Franzani
 Luis Jara
 Kike Morandé
 Katherine Salosny
 Tonka Tomicic
 Juan Carlos Valdivia
 Julia Vial
 José Miguel Viñuela
 Antonio Vodanovic
 Andrés Caniulef
 Jean Philippe Cretton
 María Luisa Godoy
 Eva Gómez
 Amaro Gómez-Pablos
 Cristián Sánchez
 Karen Paola Bejarano
 Jennifer Warner
 Scarleth Cárdenas

Guest artists 

 J Balvin
 Prince Royce
 Río Roma
 Toco Para Vos
 Alkilados
 Cali y El Dandee
 Gente de Zona
 Diego Topa
 Luciano Pereyra
 Américo
 Luis Jara
 Valentín Trujillo
 Power Peralta
 C-Funk
 Loreto Canales
 Augusto Schuster
 Consuelo Schuster
 Luis Pedraza
 Denise Rosenthal
 Chancho en Piedra
 Tommy Rey
 Sonora Palacios
 Franco de Vita
 Paty Cantú
 Jorge González
 Orfeón de Carabineros de Chile
 Los del Río
 Daniela Castillo
 Douglas
 Juan David Rodríguez
 Johnny Sky
 Los Viking's 5
 Kudai
 Combo Tortuga
 Tomo como Rey
 Sepamoya
 Garras de Amor
 Mario Guerrero
 Leo Rey
 Cachureos
 Cantando aprendo a hablar
 El circo de Pastelito y Tachuela Chico
 La Otra Fe
 Simoney Romero
 Leandro Martínez
 Carolina Soto
 Álvaro Véliz
 Lucía Covarrubias
 Paloma Soto
 Francisca Sfeir
 Hueso Carrizo
 Bafochi
 Inti-Illimani Histórico
 Madvanna
 María Colores
 Rigeo
 Nahuel Penissi
 Noche de Brujas
 Jordan

Sponsors 

 Banco de Chile
 Babysec
 Cotidian
 LadySoft
 Nova
 Belmont
 Bilz y Pap
 Cachantún
 Cerveza Cristal
 Watt's
 Cannes
 Claro
 Colún
 Copec
 Daily Gotas
 LATAM Airlines
 Omo
 Ripley
 Sodimac
 Soprole
 Tapsin
 Superior
 Té Supremo

References

External links

Telethon
Chilean telethons